Rangarajan Mohan Kumaramangalam (born 6 July 1978) is an Indian politician and businessman. He is one of the working presidents of Tamil Nadu Congress Committee. He serves as President of All India Professionals' Congress-Tamilnadu and member of All India Congress Committee.

Family and personal life
Kumaramangalam was born in 1978 at Chennai, into a family of mixed Tamil Gounder, Bengali Brahmin and Punjabi heritage. His paternal family, the Kumaramangalams, are an affluent, feudal, propertied family belonging to the Kongu Vellalar community. They were the zamindars (feudal landlords) of Kumaramangalam Estate under the auspices of the British Raj. The estate was located near Tiruchengode in what was the Salem district of Madras Presidency (now it is in Namakkal district of Tamil Nadu).

Kumaramangalam is the fourth generation of this family to be involved in politics. His paternal great-grandfather, P. Subbarayan, last ruling Zamindar, was Chief Minister of Madras Presidency for nearly four years (1926–30) thanks to the patronage of the British government, who nominated him to that post. Kumaramangalam's paternal grand-uncle, Paramasiva Prabhakar Kumaramangalam, was the 6th Chief of the Indian Army, and the last of the British-era King's Commissioned Indian Officers to hold that position. Kumaramangalam's paternal grandfather, Mohan Kumaramangalam, was a Communist Party ideologue, politician and union cabinet minister. Kumaramangalam's paternal aunt, Lalitha Kumaramangalam, daughter of Mohan and Kalyani Kumaramangalam, is a politician, member of the BJP and former head of the National Commission for Women.

Kumaramangalam's paternal grandmother, Kalyani Kumaramangalam née Mukherjee, wife of Mohan Kumaramangalam, came from a politically prominent Bengali Brahmin family. She was the niece of Ajoy Mukherjee, Congress Party leader and three-time Chief Minister of West Bengal. She was also the niece of Biswanath Mukherjee, a communist party member perhaps better known as the husband of fire-brand communist parliamentarian Geeta Mukherjee.

Kumaramangalam's father, Rangarajan Kumaramangalam, was a BJP politician (earlier a Congress Party politician) and served as the Union Minister for Power in the Vajpayee Government from 1998 until his untimely death in 2000. Kumaramangalam's mother, Kitty Kumaramangalam, comes from a Punjabi business family. In July 2021, Kitty, who lived alone in Delhi, was murdered by someone who used to come regularly to do chores around her house. The motive was robbery.

Kumaramangalam himself is married to Amrita, a Sindhi lady from Lucknow who speaks Hindi and English, but no Tamil. They have two children.

Early life and education
Kumaramangalam attended Don Bosco School in Egmore until age six, when he moved to Delhi when his father, Pharindranath Rangarajan Kumaramangalam, won the Salem parliamentary seat. In Delhi, he attended Springdales School after which he moved to DPS R.K. Puram. On completion of his schooling, he attended Illinois Institute of Technology where he graduated with a Bachelors in Engineering in Computer Science.

Rangarajan Kumaramangalam died in 2000, aged 48, of acute myeloid leukaemia (blood cancer). He was at that time the Power Minister in the then Atal Bihari Vajpayee ministry. Kumaramangalam was only 22, and he remained mostly abroad for the next 11 years, building a career in the corporate world. He chose to come back to India in that year for unknown reasons, and entered politics as heir to his father.

Career

Technology 
In 1999, he returned to India to start his own venture, an early private internet service provider, Sampark Online. He received funding from angel investors in Santa Monica and India and corporate investors including telecom manufacturer Alcatel and France Telecom. Subsequent to this venture, he worked in startups before consulting with AT Kearney. He then joined a small group of technologists in ICICI Bank in 2002 where together they created the roadmap for ICICI Bank's technology adoption.

In 2004 he joined MIT Sloan School of Management to pursue an MBA in entrepreneurship and finance. He was among three awardees in his class of the Mckinsey Scholarship at Sloan School of Management. At Sloan, he chaired the India-China investment conference and led a small team of students to win the Regional Kauffman Venture Capital Investment Competition. He worked with Nokia Ventures to explore investments in new technologies and after graduating joined Microsoft as a product manager.

In his five years at Microsoft, Mohan had four jobs, working in product marketing, product planning and product implementation, all on the Windows Phone and IPhone platforms. He was judged in the top 1% of all employees in both technical and marketing roles.

Politics
In 2011, Mohan returned to India to enter politics. He contested a youth Congress election in Salem and lost by a small margin to a local incumbent. He then worked as a youth Congress office bearer for five years, first in the district and then as a state general secretary. In 2014, he contested general election from the constituency of Salem on a Congress ticket and lost to the challenger from AIADMK. He began working in his constituency on youth sports, water conservation and education. He became President of the Salem District Athletics Association and In 2017 was appointed President of the Tamil Nadu Professionals Congress. He is serving as the working president of Tamil Nadu Pradesh Congress Committee.

Elections

References

External links 

Living people
1978 births
Indian National Congress politicians from Tamil Nadu
Politicians from Chennai
Illinois Institute of Technology alumni